McDonald Mariga Wanyama (born 4 April 1987) is a Kenyan retired footballer who played as a defensive midfielder.

Mariga made history as the first Kenyan footballer to play in the UEFA Champions League, for Internazionale on 16 March 2010. In 2019 he joined politics to vie for Kibera parliamentary seat after the death of Ken Okoth.

Club career

Early career
Mariga started his playing career at Ulinzi Stars before moving first to Tusker FC and then to Kenya Pipeline while still at school. Mariga was a member of the Kamukunji High School 'Golden Boys', which also included Kenyan striker Dennis Oliech (Auxerre, France), who won two consecutive National Championships in 2002 and 2003.

The central midfielder went to Sweden in 2005 to play for third Division side Enköpings SK. After only one season at ESK, he signed for Helsingborgs IF before the 2006 season. His success at Helsingborgs was immediate. Following initial interest from Portsmouth manager Harry Redknapp, Mariga looked set to sign for the Premier League team, but work permit issues held up the deal which was supposed to have cost around €2.7 million.

Parma
He moved to the Serie A club Parma initially on loan in August 2007. The Italian club had an option to buy him in the summer for a fee of 20 million Swedish kronor (around €2million). 

Mariga played 35 times for Parma in the Serie B during the 2008–2009 season scoring three times to help them back to Serie A for the 2009–10 season.

In January 2010 he was set to sign for English club Manchester City of the Premier League, but he failed to obtain a work permit. It was later stated by Kenya's Prime Minister Raila Odinga that 22-year-old Mariga had eventually obtained a UK work permit but only after the transfer window for the Premier League had closed. Had Mariga successfully signed for Manchester City, he would have been the first player from the East African country to sign for a club in the top English league - a milestone later achieved by his brother, upon his transfer to Southampton in July 2013.

Internazionale
On 1 February 2010, the last day of the transfer window, Mariga moved to Inter in a co-ownership deal. The transfer fee was €5 million in a cash plus player deal which Parma got half the registration rights of Jonathan Biabiany (€2.5 million) and the loan of Luis Antonio Jiménez. Following the move, Inter chairman Massimo Moratti hailed Mariga's move as the "best thing that could have happened" to the club in the January transfer window. He made his debut for Internazionale in the 1st leg of the 2009-10 Coppa Italia Semi-final against Fiorentina. Inter narrowly won the match 1–0. In March 2010 Mariga became the first Kenyan to play in the UEFA Champions League, when he entered the field as a late substitute against Chelsea.

Mariga thought he scored his first goal for Inter on 24 April 2010 against Atalanta when he netted Samuel Eto'o's back pass into the roof of the net. However his shot deflected off Sulley Muntari and the goal was credited instead to the Ghanaian. He also scored a thrashing header against Genoa for the Nerazzurri in a game that ended 3–2.

On 17 June 2010, Inter bought him outright and bought back Biabiany for €4.2 million each, which made Parma registered a "loss from co-ownership" of €800,000, as the retained profit of unsold half had decreased from €5 million to €4.2 million. However, if counting the profit from Biabiany, which Inter in fact paid Parma €10.9 million cash for Mariga plus the special loan of Biabiany. While Luis Antonio Jiménez originally included in the deal but collapsed after Inter lost its portion on 25 June.

At the start of the 2011–12 season Mariga was loaned out to La Liga club Real Sociedad. It meant Inter had a non-EU transfer quota which they used on winter signing Juan and Fredy Guarín (the other quota was obtained from Philippe Coutinho). After half a season back at Inter, he was loaned to Parma in the January 2013 transfer window and he scored his only goal against Lazio. In the next fixture he was injured against Novara, which ruled him out for the rest of the season. He returned to Inter along with Biabiany at the end of the season at the request of manager Andrea Stramaccioni, but was released by the club in May 2014.

Return to Parma
On 4 September 2014, Mariga re-signed with Parma, the team he left to join Inter in 2010.

Latina
In January 2016 he was signed by Serie B club Latina.

Oviedo
On 31 July 2017, Mariga signed a one-year deal with Spanish Segunda División club Real Oviedo.

International career

Mariga scored his first international goal for Kenya against Swaziland on 25 March 2007.

Personal life
Mariga's father, Noah Wanyama, a left-winger, played for A.F.C. Leopards and the Kenya national football team. His younger brother Victor Wanyama is also a professional football player, who is currently playing for Major League Soccer club Montreal Impact, while his other brothers Thomas and Sylvester are also footballers in the Kenyan Premier League. Their younger sister Mercy was the captain of the Lang'ata High School basketball team, and previously played football and netball.

In 2013, Mariga ended his engagement to his long-time Rwandese fiancée Ariane Umutoni, after relations between the couple reportedly deteriorated.

Political ambitions

In September 2019, Mariga made a debut in Kenya's politics after announcing plans to contest for a parliamentary seat in a by-election in one of the constituencies (Kibra).
He was nominated by the Jubilee Party as its flag bearer in the Kibra by-election. The by-election was occasioned by the death of former MP Ken Okoth, who died on 26 July 2019, after a long battle with colon cancer.

The Kenyan electoral commission IEBC; has however, not cleared Mariga to participate in the election.
Although Mariga had applied to be registered as a voter on 26 August 2019 in Starehe constituency, the IEBC insisted that his name was not in its register. Mariga appealed the decision, but the matter is yet to be concluded. If he qualifies to vie, he will face off with Bernard Okoth of ODM and several other contestants.

Career statistics

International
Scores and results list Kenya's goal tally first.

Honours 
Helsingborgs IF

 Svenska Cupen: 2006

Inter Milan

 Serie A: 2009–10
 Coppa Italia: 2009–10 , 2010–11
 Supercoppa Italiana: 2011
 UEFA Champions League: 2009–10
 FIFA Club World Cup: 2010

See also

References

External links
Real Sociedad official profile 
McDonald Mariga Moves to Serie B club in Italy

1987 births
Living people
Footballers from Nairobi
Kenyan Luhya people
Kenyan footballers
Association football midfielders
Tusker F.C. players
Enköpings SK players
Helsingborgs IF players
Parma Calcio 1913 players
Inter Milan players
Real Sociedad footballers
Real Oviedo players
Allsvenskan players
Serie A players
Serie B players
La Liga players
UEFA Champions League winning players
Kenya international footballers
Kenyan expatriate footballers
Kenyan expatriate sportspeople in Sweden
Kenyan expatriate sportspeople in Italy
Kenyan expatriate sportspeople in Spain
Expatriate footballers in Sweden
Expatriate footballers in Italy
Expatriate footballers in Spain